Vaughan Thomas (birth registered second ¼ 1945) is an English former professional rugby league footballer who played in the 1960s.

Background
Vaughan Thomas' birth was registered in Wakefield district, West Riding of Yorkshire, England.

Playing career
Thomas made his début for Featherstone Rovers on Saturday 14 March 1964.

Challenge Cup Final appearances
Thomas played , i.e. number 2, and scored a try in Featherstone Rovers' 17–12 victory over Barrow in the 1966–67 Challenge Cup Final during the 1966–67 season at Wembley Stadium, London on Saturday 13 May 1967, in front of a crowd of 76,290.

Genealogical information
Vaughan Thomas is the cousin of the rugby league footballer; Carl Dooler.

References

External links

Search for "Thomas" at rugbyleagueproject.org
Vaughan Thomas
Rugby League: Back o' t' Wall by …
Vaughan Thomas did indeed play for Fev first and he scored a 40-yard breakaway try…

1945 births
Living people
Bradford Bulls players
English rugby league players
Featherstone Rovers players
Rugby league wingers
Rugby league players from Wakefield